Vilobí d'Onyar is a municipality in the comarca of the Selva in Catalonia, Spain. It is situated in the valley of the Onyar river, on the GE-533 road between Santa Coloma de Farners and Riudellots de la Selva. A substantial part of the northern portion of the municipality is taken up by Girona-Costa Brava Airport.

Demography

Notable people
 Ferrán Corominas, former footballer

Jordi Matamala was a former professional footballer for Girona cf

References

 Panareda Clopés, Josep Maria; Rios Calvet, Jaume; Rabella Vives, Josep Maria (1989). Guia de Catalunya, Barcelona: Caixa de Catalunya.  (Spanish).  (Catalan).

External links
Official website 
 Government data pages 

Municipalities in Selva
Populated places in Selva